Pagodulinidae is a family of gastropods belonging to the superfamily Pupilloidea .

Genera
 Pagodulina Clessin, 1876
Genera brought into synonymy
 Crystallifera Schileyko, 1976: synonym of Pagodulina Clessin, 1876
 Pagodina Stabile, 1864: synonym of Pagodulina Clessin, 1876
 Pagodinella Thiele, 1917 : synonym of Pagodulina Clessin, 1876
 Pagodula P. Hesse, 1916: synonym of Pagodulina Clessin, 1876

References

External links
 

Pupilloidea